Palakkayam is a village in the Palakkad district, state of Kerala, India. It is administrated by the Thachampara grama panchayath. Palakkayam is about 16 km from Siruvani Dam Eco tourism spot, connected to Edakkurussi on Palakkad-Kozhikode National Highway about 33 km from Palakkad and 120 km from Kozhikode. Kanjirapuzha Dam, a masonry earth dam built for providing irrigation is located is located about 6 km from Palakkayam. The nearest airport is Coimbatore, about 100 km and nearest Rly Stn is Palakkad Jn, about 30 km.the nearest hospital assumption hospital kanjirapuzha.nearest school carmel hss palakkayam.

Demographics
 India census, Palakkayam had a population of 9,354 with 4,673 males and 4,681 females.

References

Villages in Palakkad district